Zgornja Gorica is a small settlement in the Municipality of Rače–Fram in northeastern Slovenia. It lies on the flatlands on the right bank of the Drava River south of Rače. The area is part of the traditional region of Styria. The municipality is now included in the Drava Statistical Region.

The village chapel dates to the early 20th century.

References

External links
Zgornja Gorica at Geopedia

Populated places in the Municipality of Rače-Fram